Tears was a planned Czech 1997 RPG video game developed by Hypnomagic and published BBS Interactive Multimedia for DOS. In production as of 1995, it had a planned release date for 2001 but was never completed.

References 

1997 video games